Kids for Kids is a British nonprofit charity formed in 2001 to help children struggling to survive in remote villages in Darfur, Sudan. It is the only charity created specifically to help the children of Darfur.  It has been previously listed in the top three UK charities for the International Development Charity of the Year at the UK Charity Awards. As of January 2023 it has transformed the lives of over 570,000 people.

The charity was founded by Patricia Parker OBE to support children who are facing hardship in remote villages of Darfur.  Kids for Kids provides long term self-sustainable projects, identified by the communities themselves and, uniquely, run by them. Projects are designed to prevent small problems from becoming disasters.  It transforms the lives of individual families - the most deprived in each remote village - out of abject poverty immediately, and transforms the whole community long term. 

The original inspiration for the charity was a chance meeting between Parker and a nine-year-old Sudanese child from the village of Um Ga'al who was struggling across the desert in the immense heat of Darfur, to fetch water for his brothers and sisters. It was a walk that took him seven hours, and then he faced the long walk back.  The water he collected would also be used to keep three goats alive—their milk was the children's only source of protein, minerals and vitamins.

About Kids for Kids 

Kids for Kids supports grass roots projects that communities identify as the most effective way of enabling them to help themselves.  Kids for Kids produces a Project Implementation Manual which is a unique contract between the communities and the charity, detailing what each can expect from the other. All volunteers in each village, and all beneficiaries, are elected democratically.  Each year the volunteers and beneficiaries report to the community at an Annual Review Meeting.   If the village shows it has been running the projects well they may then request a Kindergarten, Health Centre, Veterinary Centre or other community asset - subject to funding being available.

Many Kids for Kids handpumps are treasured as a living memorial for someone who has died, or to celebrate something special. In some areas, where hand pumps prove that there is plentiful water, they can be converted to submersible solar powered pumps which will help many people. Kids for Kids also trains midwives due to the lack of healthcare in the villages. When there is obstructed labour, a common complication in a region where female genital mutilation is widespread, rope delivery is the only form of help. The charity trains first aid workers who treat simple wounds, teach hygiene and even build latrines  It also provides veterinary care to all the animals in each village by training paravets and veterinary drugs. Additionally, Kids for Kids trains people in farming techniques and water harvesting, provides donkeys—the only transport in a region where there are no roads—donkey ploughs, carts and water carts, farm tools and seeds, blankets, mosquito nets and other household essentials—and, most importantly, it provides and repairs hand pumps. Long term improvement of the environment, the planting of trees, is another priority, and forms another source of income for families.  To date Kids for Kids has funded over 57,000 drought resistant trees. 

An extensive tree planting campaign has been funded since 2006, with a Demonstration Garden in the main Tree Nursery in El Fasher, where trees planted back in 2006 are now tall enough to give shade and where people come to picnic at weekends. Kids for Kids has also funded a new Midwives Training School in El Fasher where they fund the training of 40 village midwives each year. But the Key project is a Goat Loan. The poorest 15 percent of families in each Kids for Kids village is lent five goats to provide milk immediately for the children and to enable mothers to have a livelihood as the little flock multiplies. At the end of two years five goats are passed on to another poor family, and so on.  Eventually the whole community benefits from this simple, life changing, loan. It has been called the best Microfinance project ever. To ensure that the projects are sustainable and there is clear accountability, the management of the projects is carried out by village committees which are trained in book keeping—but, most importantly, they are accountable to their own communities. This has ensured that the projects have survived even during the worst periods of violence.

Kids for Kids works directly with villagers with the help of one of the most prominent veterinary doctors in Darfur, Dr Salim Ahmed Salim. Dr Salim has been appointed Kids for Kids Programme Manager and, with Project Manager Hassan Mihisi works on projects which include hand pumps, first aid workers, midwives and blankets and mosquito nets as well as tree projects and the new Kindergarten Projects which commenced with the first in Abu Nahla, a remote village northeast of the regional capital, El Fasher. Various communities have said that the Kids for Kids simple integrated projects—the loan of goats and donkeys, training of midwives and para-vets and much more—are enabling them to stay in their homes.

In February 2005 Patricia Parker and her son were abducted by rebels in Darfur but subsequently released unharmed. At one point during the abduction the leader of the rebels shouted: ‘Don’t you understand that I could have you killed at any moment?’ but Parker kept smiling and said: ‘Of course I do—but I also know about Sudanese hospitality and I know that I am perfectly safe’. They were released the following morning.  Kids for Kids went on to adopt this village, Kulkul, and is now providing a range of sustainable projects to the families and helping them out of poverty.

In 2013, in response to the appeal of hundreds of women in Darfur, Kids for Kids opened its first Kindergarten at Abu Nahla. This was one of the first brick buildings in the village and includes latrines, a veranda (shade and an extra classroom) a water tank and fruit trees.  Kids for Kids worked closely with the State Ministry of Education which is funding the kindergarten's teacher. The Director of the State Ministry of Education said that it is the first school of its kind in Darfur.  There are currently 14 kindergartens in villages in Darfur that are fully equipped with toys for both indoor and outdoor use.  Other schools include Abu Digeise (supported by Joanna Lumley OBE) Azagarfa (supported by City of London School), Um Ga'al, Kindro, Hillat Hamid, Siwailinga, Golo C and Sakori amongst others. As a result, every village in Darfur has since requested help from Kids for Kids in the building of their own kindergartens.

Each year Kids for Kids adopts five new villages where it commits to providing the package of basic projects aimed at improving lives on the long-term. Indirect benefits such as tomatoes and okra now flourish where once there was nothing but sand. Today conditions are worse even than when Kids for Kids was founded.  Drought, floods, pests, Covid, soaring inflation and, worse, continued violence, have led to severe hardship. Parker says "Kids for Kids is needed even more now than in 2001. Sadly the world has forgotten Darfur.   People tell us they have given up hope in the international community, but not in Kids for Kids. But raising funds has become even harder at a time when we are needed most."

Notable Supporters and Patrons 
Kids for Kids has been mentioned with approval in debates in the House of Lords and other notable supporters include Ruth Rendell,(sadly now passed away) Miriam Margolyes OBE and Timothy West OBE.  Javier Solana  donated half his Carnegie-Wateler Peace Prize money to Kids for Kids in 2007.

Kids for Kids Patrons include Dame Joanna Lumley|Joanna Lumley OBE FRGS]], Lord Cope of Berkeley PC, Eamonn Holmes OBE and Sir William Patey KCMG.

Kids for Kids in the News

 Independent Catholic News
 Grosvenor London
 New Statesman
 Culture Whisper
 The Resident
 inChelsea
 The Riverside Journals
 The Idealist
 Artists and Illustrators
The Mail & Guardian (Zimbabwe).

References

External links
 
Famine in Darfur

Children's charities based in the United Kingdom
Development charities based in the United Kingdom
Water-related charities